The 1950  Hardin Indians football team was an American football team that represented Midwestern University—now known as Midwestern State University–as a member of the Gulf Coast Conference (GCC) during the 1950 college football season. Led by Billy Stamps in his third and final season as head coach, the Indians compiled an overall record of 4–5–1 with a mark of 1–0–1 in conference play, sharing the GCC title with North Texas State.

Schedule

References

Midwestern
Midwestern State Mustangs football seasons
Midwestern Indians football